Thomas Pleydell Bedford (born 8 February 1942 in Bloemfontein, South Africa) is a South African former rugby union player who represented the national team, the Springboks, 25 times, also captaining the Springboks on three occasions. He became known for his opposition to South Africa's racial segregation policy of apartheid, especially as it affected sports.

Career
Tommy Bedford was educated in Kimberley, Northern Cape at Christian Brothers College and in Durban at the University of Natal, where he studied architecture in the early 1960s and was captain of the university rugby team. At the university he held the relatively conservative attitudes typical of most white South African students at the time. In 1965 Bedford won a Rhodes Scholarship to the University of Oxford, where his exposure to a more international environment made him a committed opponent of apartheid, especially as it affected South African rugby.

Bedford played for and became captain of the Natal Province rugby team. His playing style was deeply influenced by the provincial coach Izak van Heerden, who, Bedford declared "..was streets ahead of his time. We had a genius for a coach...His teams played this instinctive, expressive, fantastic brand of rugby".

Tommy Bedford won the first of his 25 caps against Australia as a flank forward on 13 July 1963. Though he appeared as a 21-year-old flank forward in six Test matches, it was the number 8 position that established him as a player of outstanding quality on the international scene.

As very athletic and dynamic number 8 he formed a remarkably efficient and complementary back-row partnership with Jan Ellis and Piet Greyling. He made his debut against the Lions in an historic Test at Loftus Versfeld in Pretoria - the first ever international in which replacements were allowed for injury, though no more than four players per team could be replaced in a match at the time. He played number 8 in all four Tests against the 1968 Lions with South Africa winning the tightly fought series 3–0, with one drawn, when in both the first and third Tests the winning margin was only five points. The young Durban architect also led his country three times, against Australia (twice) and Scotland on the 1969 tour to Britain and Ireland.

Despite his prowess as a player and captain, it is thought that his relentless and uncompromising criticism of the apartheid system and the rugby establishment contributed to a premature end of his playing career. He retired from international rugby after the drawn Test with France in Durban in 1971. He thereafter practiced his profession as an architect.

Notes and references

1942 births
Living people
Oxford University RFC players
Richmond F.C. players
Rugby union number eights
Rugby union players from Bloemfontein
Sharks (Currie Cup) players
South Africa international rugby union players
South Africa national rugby union team captains
South African people of British descent
South African Rhodes Scholars
South African rugby union players
University of Natal alumni